Acacia argentina is a species of Acacia native to eastern Australia.

Description
The new branchlet tips are silvery grey in colour but tinged with yellow. It flowers between July and September. The simple axillary inflorescences have up to eight branches each containing a yellow spherical flowerhead with a diameter of around  composed of 20 to 24 flowers. Following flowering linear seed pods with a length of about  covered with stiff hairs. The species resembles Acacia chinchillensis but is taller with wider leaflets.

Taxonomy
The species was first formally described by the botanist Leslie Pedley in 2006 as part of the work Notes on Acacia Mill. (Leguminosae: Mimosoideae), chiefly from Queensland as published in the journal Austrobaileya.

Distribution
The species has a limited range and is only found in a small area in the sandstone parts of the upper catchment areas of smaller tributaries of the Dawson River to the north of Taroom in south western Queensland.

See also
List of Acacia species

References

argentina
Fabales of Australia
Flora of Queensland
Plants described in 2006
Taxa named by Leslie Pedley